SHC014-CoV is a SARS-like coronavirus (SL-COV) which infects horseshoe bats (family Rhinolophidae). It was discovered in Kunming in Yunnan Province, China. It was discovered along with SL-CoV Rs3367, which was the first bat SARS-like coronavirus shown to directly infect a human cell line. The line of Rs3367 that infected human cells was named Bat SARS-like coronavirus WIV1.

Discovery 
From April 2011 to September 2012, researchers from the Wuhan Institute of Virology  collected 117 anal swabs and fecal samples of bats from a Chinese rufous horseshoe bats (Rhinolophus sinicus) colony in Kunming City (Yunnan Province in south-western China). 27 out of 117 samples (23%) contained seven different isolates of SARS-like coronaviruses, among which were two previously unknown, called RsSHC014 and Rs3367.

Virology 
In 2013, bat SARS-like coronavirus Rs3367 was shown to be able to directly infect the human HeLa cell line. It was the first time that human cells had been infected with a bat SARS-like coronavirus in the lab. The strain of Rs3367 that infected the human cells was named “Bat SARS-like coronavirus WIV”.

In 2015, the University of North Carolina at Chapel Hill and the Wuhan Institute of Virology conducted research showing that SHC014 could be made to infect the human HeLa cell line, through the use of reverse genetics to create a chimeric virus consisting of a surface protein of SHC014 and the backbone of a SARS coronavirus.

The SL-SHC014-MA15 version of the virus, primarily engineered to infect mice, has been shown to differ by over 5,000 nucleotides from SARS-CoV-2, the cause of the COVID-19 pandemic.

Phylogenetic

See also 
 Bat coronavirus RaTG13

References

References 
 

Bat virome
2013 in China
2013 in biology
2015 in biology
SARS-related coronavirus
Infraspecific virus taxa